Alan Snow (born 1959 in Kent, England) is an English author and illustrator of children's literature. He is best known for his best selling novel Here Be Monsters! (2005), which was adapted into a stop-animation film by Laika under the name The Boxtrolls, released in 2014.

Snow grew up in the county of Wiltshire and went on to study fashion design and illustration at the Salisbury College of Art. After college he worked in variety of different jobs before becoming primarily an author and illustrator of children's books. Since then he has illustrated over 160 books and worked on the art design of video games and animation movies as well. Moreover, he was involved in the design of children's science museum in Japan.
 
In 2005 Snow published his novel Here Be Monsters!, which he illustrated himself with over 500 drawings. The novel, which was also published in three separate volumes, is the first part of the Ratbridge Chronicles. The Ratbridge Chronicles are a series of novels and stories playing in the fictitious Victorian city of Ratbridge, in the underground of which the boxtrolls live.

Selected works 
Machines, cars, boats, and airplanes (1989)
Big Book of Knowledge (1992)
The Monster Book of ABC Sounds (1994)
The Truth about Cats (1995)
What Color Is It? What Shape Is It? (1995)
Here be Monsters! (2005), part of the Ratbridge Chronicles
Wacky Guide to Paper Fun (2007)
How Dogs Really Work (2009)
How Cats Really Work (2009)
Worse Things Happen At Sea (2010), part of the Ratbridge Chronicles
How Dinosaurs Really Work (2012)
How Pirates Really Work (2013)

External links
The Boxtrolls at Focus Features, contains a short biography of Alan Snow
Boxtrolls author Alan Snow interview: seeing the world of the boxtrolls made solid by other artists is more than odd at theguardian.com 
''Interview with Alan Snow, the author behind this autumn's biggest family film The Boxtrolls Interview with Alan Snow, the author behind this autumn's biggest family film The Boxtrolls at cineworld.co.uk
http://here-be-monsters.com - website about the Ratbridge Chronicles

1959 births
Living people
20th-century English novelists
21st-century English novelists
21st-century British novelists
People from Kent